Kent Floerke (born January 16, 1936) is an American athlete. He competed in the men's triple jump at the 1964 Summer Olympics.

References

1936 births
Living people
Athletes (track and field) at the 1964 Summer Olympics
American male triple jumpers
Olympic track and field athletes of the United States
Place of birth missing (living people)